The Bobbie Rosenfeld Award is an annual award given to Canada's female athlete of the year. The sports writers of the Canadian Press (CP) first conducted a poll to determine the nation's top female in 1932, naming track star Hilda Strike the winner. The CP formalized the poll into an award in 1978, presenting their winner a plaque. It was named after Bobbie Rosenfeld, an all-around athlete and Olympic track and field champion whom the news organization had named its top athlete of the half-century in 1950. The award is separate from the Northern Star Award, in which a select panel of sports writers vote for their top overall athlete.

The poll was suspended for four years during the Second World War after the CP decided it could not name a sporting "hero" at a time when Canadian soldiers were fighting in Europe. Figure skater Barbara Ann Scott was the first woman to lead the poll three times, accomplishing the feat in consecutive years between 1946 and 1948.  That total was matched by speed skater Catriona Le May Doan in 2002. Golfer Marlene Streit finished top of the poll the most times, winning on five occasions between 1952 and 1963.

The 2022 winner was hockey player Marie-Philip Poulin.

Voting
The CP first voted on a athletes of the year in 1932, the same year it inaugurated a poll that became the Lionel Conacher Award for the nation's top male athlete.  The poll is separate from the previously existing Velma Springstead Trophy, which also names a female athlete of the year and was first presented by the Women's Amateur Athletic Federation of Canada in 1932.

Hilda Strike was selected the first winner on a straight vote of each writer's top choice. By 1935, the poll was conducted using a points system where voters ranked their top three choices.  Each writer's top pick received three points, their second two, and their third one.  A tie occurred in 1971 as pentathlete Debbie Van Kiekebelt and high jumper Debbie Brill finished with an identical 208 points. Van Kiekebelt had more first place votes, 55 to 38, however the two women were named co-winners of the award.  Barbara Ann Scott was the first woman to unanimously win the award, doing so in 1947.  Scott nearly duplicated the feat the following year, however the lone dissenting vote was given to a mare, Victory Gift.

No winner was selected for the year 1950, as the CP instead chose Bobbie Rosenfeld as Canada's female athlete of the half-century.  Skier Nancy Greene was voted Canada's female athlete of the century in 1999.  Greene was herself a two-time winner of the annual poll, and was also an Olympic gold medallist, six-time Canadian champion and twice won the Alpine World Cup.  Voters selected their first disabled athlete as the winner in 2008, naming wheelchair racer Chantal Petitclerc the recipient of the Bobbie Rosenfeld Award after she won five gold medals and set three world records at the 2008 Summer Paralympics in Beijing. Golfers have won the most awards at 14, followed by Swimmers with 13 awards and skiers (including biathlete Myriam Bédard) with 12.  Figure skaters have 10 victories.

List of winners

Notes
 According to the Canadian Press, the award was discontinued between 1942 and 1945 because "sports writers decided athletes cannot rate as heroes while young Canadian pilots, paratroopers and corvette gunners fought for freedom in the shadow of death".

 Denotes athlete also won the Northern Star Award as Canadian athlete of the year

 No winner was announced for the years 1950 or 1999 as the Canadian Press instead voted for athlete of the half-century and century, respectively.

 Joint winners named in 1971

References

Further reading

Hall, M. Ann (2002), The girl and the game : a history of women's sport in Canada, Broadview Press 
Greatest Sporting Moments: The Bobbie Rosenfeld and Lionel Conacher Award Winners in the Virtual Museum of Canada

Canadian sports trophies and awards
Most valuable player awards